Breunnerite is a variety of magnesite, with a magnesium/iron ratio of 90/10 to 70/30.

References

External links
Mindat

Magnesium minerals
Iron(II) minerals
Carbonate minerals